Andrew Michael Kavovit (born July 19, 1971) is an American actor.

Kavovit played  Paul Ryan (formerly Stenbeck) on the CBS soap opera As the World Turns from 1986 to 1991, when both he and the character were teenagers.   He won the Daytime Emmy Award in 1990 for his portrayal.

Early life and career 
Kavovit was born in Bronx, New York, grew up in Yorktown Heights, and graduated from Yorktown High School in 1989.

After appearing on As the World Turns, Kavovit had a main role in the short-lived CBS prime time series version of The Magnificent Seven.

In 2014, Kavovit appeared on an episode of the television series  Shark Tank dedicated to child inventors, with his daughter Kiowa.

Filmography

References

External links
 

1971 births
American male soap opera actors
American male television actors
Living people
Male actors from New York City
Daytime Emmy Award winners
Daytime Emmy Award for Outstanding Younger Actor in a Drama Series winners
People from the Bronx
People from Yorktown Heights, New York